Pamela Barrera (born 31 May 1990) is a Peruvian female volleyball player. She was part of the Peru women's national volleyball team at the 2010 FIVB Volleyball Women's World Championship in Japan.
She played for Florida A&M University.

Clubs
  Club Sporting Cristal (2011)

References

External links
FIVB profile

1990 births
Living people
Peruvian women's volleyball players
Volleyball players at the 2007 Pan American Games
Florida A&M Lady Rattlers volleyball players
Peruvian expatriates in the United States
Pan American Games competitors for Peru
21st-century Peruvian women